Wolfgang Wenzel (born 12 April 1952) is a German former sailor. He competed in the Flying Dutchman event at the 1980 Summer Olympics.

References

External links
 

1952 births
Living people
German male sailors (sport)
Olympic sailors of East Germany
Sailors at the 1980 Summer Olympics – Flying Dutchman
People from Ludwigslust
Sportspeople from Mecklenburg-Western Pomerania